Natives of the Arabian Peninsula, many Qataris are descended from a number of migratory Arab tribes that came to Qatar in the 18th century from mainly the neighboring areas of Nejd and Al-Hasa. Some are descended from Omani tribes. Qatar has about 2.6 million inhabitants as of early 2017, the vast majority of whom (about 92%) live in Doha, the capital. Foreign workers amount to around 88% of the population, the largest of which comprise South Asians, with those from India alone estimated to be around 700,000. Egyptians and Filipinos are the largest non-South Asian migrant group in Qatar. The treatment of these foreign workers has been heavily criticized with conditions suggested to be modern slavery. However the International Labour Organization published report in November 2022 that contained multiple reforms by Qatar for its migrant workers. The reforms included the establishment of the minimum wage, wage protection regulations, improved access for workers to justice, etc. It included data from last 4 years of progress in workers conditions of Qatar. The report also revealed that the freedom to change jobs was initiated, implementation of Occupational safety and health & labor inspection, and also the required effort from the nation’s side.

The Qataris are mainly Sunni Muslims. Islam is the official religion, and Islamic jurisprudence is the basis of Qatar's legal system. A significant minority religion is Hindu due to the large amount of Qatar’s migrant workers coming from India.

Arabic is the official language and English is the lingua franca of business. Hindi-Urdu and Bengali are among the most widely spoken languages by the foreign workers. Education in Qatar is compulsory and free for all citizens 6–16 years old. The country has an increasingly high literacy rate.

Population

By nationality
Native Qataris can be divided into three ethnic groups: Bedouin Arabs, Hadar, and Afro-Arab. They comprise 11.6% of the country's population.

A 2011–2014 report by the International Organization for Migration recorded 176,748 Nepali Citizens living in Qatar as migrant workers. In 2012 about 7,000 Turkish nationals lived in Qatar and in 2016 about 1,000 Colombian nationals and descendants lived in Qatar. No official numbers are published of the foreign population broken down by nationality, however a Qatari firm provides estimates as of 2019:

Vital statistics

UN estimates

Registered births and deaths

Population Estimates by Sex and Age Group (01.VII.2019):

Life expectancy

Religions
 Islam 67.7% (Official) 
 Hindus 15.1%
 Christian 13.8%
 Non religious 1.9%
 Buddhist 3.1%

Languages
Arabic is the official language of Qatar according to Article 1 of the Constitution.

English is the de facto second language of Qatar, and is very commonly used in business. Because of Qatar's varied ethnic landscape, English has been recognized as the most convenient medium for people of different backgrounds to communicate with each other. The history of English use in the country dates back to the mid-19th and early 20th centuries when the British Empire would frequently draft treaties and agreements with the emirates of the Persian Gulf. One such treaty was the 1916 protectorate treaty signed between Abdullah bin Jassim Al Thani and the British representative Percy Cox, under which Qatar would be placed under British administration in exchange for protection. Another agreement drafted in English came in 1932 and was signed between the Qatari government and the Anglo-Persian Oil Company. These agreements were mainly facilitated by foreign interpreters due to neither party possessing the required language skills for such complex arrangements. For instance, a translator and native Arabic speaker named A. A. Hilmy interpreted the 1932 agreement for Qatar.

Hindi, Urdu, Tagalog, Bengali, Tamil, Telugu and Malayalam are commonly used among Asian migrants. In 2015, there were more newspapers being printed by the government in Malayalam than in Arabic or English.

Genetics

Y-chromosome DNA
Y-Chromosome DNA Y-DNA represents the male lineage, The Qatari Y-chromosome in large belongs to haplogroup J which comprises two thirds of the total chromosomes
 J1 ≈58.3%
 J2 ≈8.3%
 E* ≈7.0% — E(xE1b1b)
 R1a ≈6.9%
 E1b1b ≈5.6%
 Other Haplogroups ≈13.9%

Mitochondrial DNA
Mitochondrial DNA (mtDNA) represents the female lineage The Qatari mitochondrial DNA shows much more diversity than the Y-DNA lineages, with more than 35% of the lineages showing African ancestry (East African & Subsaharan) & the rest of the lineages being Eurasian.
 R0 ~ 22% (14% R0*, 8% H)
 JT ~ 22% (18% J & 4% T)
 UK ~ 20% (11% K & 9% U)
 L3 ~ 10% (East African & Subsaharan lineages)
 Other lineages ~ 26%

References

Further reading